Gregbrownia lyman-smithii is a species of flowering plant in the family Bromeliaceae, native to Ecuador. It was first described in 1976 as Mezobromelia lyman-smithii.

References

Tillandsioideae
Endemic flora of Ecuador